An Officer is a person of authority within an organization.

Officer or Officers may also refer to:

Arts, entertainment, and media
Officer (2001 film), an Indian Hindi-language film
Officer (2018 film), an Indian Telugu-language film
Officers (film), a 1971 Russian film
Officers (video game), 2008

Roles
Officer (armed forces)
Police officer
Officer (The Salvation Army)

Other uses
Officer, Victoria, Australia
 Officer Creek, South Australia

See also